What We Do is a studio album by jazz guitarist John Scofield, the second to be released as the John Scofield Quartet. It was recorded in May of 1992 and released the following year on Blue Note. The quartet features saxophonist Joe Lovano, bassist Dennis Irwin (replacing Marc Johnson) and drummer Bill Stewart. Irwin had previously recorded with Scofield on the Bennie Wallace album Sweeping Through the City, and went on to play on two additional Scofield albums: Hand Jive (1994) and Groove Elation (1995).

Track listing
All tracks written by John Scofield.
"Little Walk" – 6:34
"Camp Out" – 8:01
"Big Sky" – 6:05
"Easy for You" – 6:41
"Call 911" – 7:27
"Imaginary Time" – 6:08
"Say the Word" – 6:26
"Why Nogales?" – 8:15
"What They Did" – 7:09

Personnel
John Scofield - electric guitar
Joe Lovano - tenor saxophone
Dennis Irwin - acoustic bass
Bill Stewart - drums

References

1993 albums
John Scofield albums
Blue Note Records albums